Human outposts are artificially-created, controlled human habitats located in environments inhospitable for humans, such as on the ocean floor, in the Antarctic, in space, or on another planet.

The logistics and difficulties inherent in such ventures have been heavily explored in science fiction.

Outposts by environment

Polar

Polar research stations have been built and advanced by many states and for many purposes. For more see the articles about research stations in Antarctica and Arctic drifting ice stations.

Under sea
NASA trains astronauts in an underwater habitat, to simulate living and working in the International Space Station. They conduct scientific research on the human body and coral reefs, and build undersea structures to simulate space station assembly spacewalk tasks. The program is also being used to study how isolation affects human behaviour, to prepare for the first human outposts on the Moon and Mars.

Outer space

The Salyut 1 space station in low Earth orbit was the first human outpost in space.  The International Space Station and Tiangong space station are the two functional human outposts in space, after China de-orbited its Tiangong-2 in 2019.

NanoRacks, after finalizing its contract with NASA, and after winning NextSTEPs Phase II award, is now developing its concept Independence-1 (previously known as Ixion), the first 'outpost' in NanoRacks' Space Outpost Program, which would turn spent rocket tanks into a habitable living area, often known as a wet workshop.

Planning and design for Lunar and Martian outposts is underway.

In fiction
Human outposts in other worlds are a common motif in science fiction, whether established and occupied solely by humans or in cooperation – or competition – with alien species.  The setting may be another planet, Earth-like or otherwise; or a spaceship large enough to house a city.

Similar concepts

See also

References

Further reading

 Resource Utilization Concepts for MoonMars; ByIris Fleischer, Olivia Haider, Morten W. Hansen, Robert Peckyno, Daniel Rosenberg and Robert E. Guinness; 30 September 2003; IAC Bremen, 2003 (29 Sept – 03 Oct 2003) and MoonMars Workshop (26-28 Sept 2003, Bremen). Accessed on 18 January 2010
 
 
 MARTIAN OUTPOST: The Challenges of Establishing a Human Settlement on Mars; by Erik Seedhouse; Praxis Publishing; 2009; .
 
 

Space colonization
Human habitats
Science fiction themes
Types of populated places
Fiction about outer space